This is a list of Chinese national-type primary schools (SJK(C)) in Kedah, Malaysia. As of June 2022, there are 89 Chinese primary schools with a total of 18,152 students.

List of Chinese national-type primary schools in Kedah

Baling District

Bandar Baharu District

Kota Setar District

Kuala Muda District

Kubang Pasu District

Kulim District

Langkawi District

Padang Terap District

Sik District

Yan District

Pendang District

Pokok Sena District

See also 

 Lists of Chinese national-type primary schools in Malaysia

References

 

Kedah
Chinese-language schools in Malaysia